Funny You Should Ask is an American television panel game show that aired from 1968 to 1969 on ABC. Hosted by Lloyd Thaxton, it was a comedy game show featuring celebrities, and aired as part of a programming block that also included The Newlywed Game and The Dating Game. The series debuted on October 28, 1968, and was produced by Heatter-Quigley Productions.

Among the show's frequent celebrity guests were Jan Murray, Rose Marie, Stu Gilliam, and Jim Backus. Additionally, many of the celebrities were fixtures on fellow Heatter-Quigley game show Hollywood Squares and several other Heatter-Quigley Productions shows.

The series is slightly related in title and format to the 2017 version of Funny You Should Ask, a game show produced by Entertainment Studios currently airing in broadcast syndication and on Comedy.tv, a network owned by Entertainment Studios.

Game play 
The game was played with a five-celebrity panel facing two contestants.

In each round, the celebrities were asked a dilemma-type question to which they gave their own opinionated answers; meanwhile, the contestants were locked away in a soundproof room. When the contestants were released from isolation, they were given the same question for the first time. They were given the celebrities' answers in no particular order and chose which celebrity gave each answer. The contestants made their choices by pressing a button corresponding to the star they wished to choose. Each time either player chose the correct star, s/he scored a point; the player with the most matches after four answers won the round and a $100 Spiegel gift certificate, which both players split in case of a tie.

If in any round any player matched four stars in a row, s/he won all the money in the "Funny Money Jackpot", which started at $100 and increased by $100 per day until won. The player with the most matches at the end of the game won a special prize. If there was a tie, a sudden-death question was asked to determine the champion; whoever got it right won it.

Running time
Unusually, the series aired in a 25-minute time slot, and was followed by a 5-minute series titled The Children's Doctor. Since it was a daytime series, it featured more advertising than a primetime series of the same period, with a 1-minute commercial break about every 5 minutes, plus plugs for the providers of prizes. The 2017 revival keeps its similar half-hour daytime format.

Availability
An episode appears on YouTube. Since the episode lacks a copyright notice, it also appears on the Internet Archive. The episode features Stu Gilliam, Rose Marie, Meredith MacRae, Marty Allen and Dean Jones. In addition, another four episodes are known to circulate among video collectors.

Theme song
This theme song was later used by KPRC-TV in Houston, for their late-afternoon newscast, The Scene at 5, with Ron Stone and Doug Johnson, from the '70s to the early '80s, and in the 1980 film How to Beat the High Cost of Living.   
The theme song is a variant of "Shades" by Patrick Williams, released in 1968.

References

External links

Episode on the Internet Archive

1968 American television series debuts
1969 American television series endings
1960s American comedy game shows
American Broadcasting Company original programming
Television series by Heatter-Quigley Productions